Sar'a, was a Palestinian Arab village located 25 km west of Jerusalem, depopulated in the 1948 war.

History

Bronze Age to Roman period

Sar'a might have been built on the ancient Canaanites site of Zorah, which became a  Danaite town.

The Romans called it Sarea.

Ottoman period
Incorporated into the Ottoman Empire in 1517 with the rest of Palestine, Saris appears in the 1596 tax records as a village in the nahiya (subdistrict) of al-Ramla under the liwa' (district) of Gaza with a population 17 Muslim households, an estimated  94 persons. The villagers  paid taxes on a number of crops, including wheat, barley, olives, goats and  beehives a total of 6,000 Akçe.
 
In 1838  Edward Robinson reported that the village  belonged to the "Keis" faction, together with Laham Sheiks, of Bayt 'Itab.

In 1863 Victor Guérin  found it to be a village with some three hundred inhabitants. An Ottoman village list of about 1870 indicated 21 houses and a population of  59, though  the population count included only men.

C.R. Conder visited the site in 1873, recognizing it as "the ancient Zoreah," and described it as being "a little mud village." In 1883, the PEF's Survey of Western Palestine (SWP) wrote that it was a moderate sized village, standing on a low hill. A domed  maqam, Neby Samat, stood to the south. SWP further noted "Caves exist here, and ruined tombs; one was a square chamber without loculi; another, a large tomb with a rock pillar, but now much broken, and the plan of the original form destroyed. This tomb is close to the Mukam of Neby Samit—a domed chamber, with an outer chamber to the west, and a door to the north, on which side is a courtyard, with a palm tree. The chamber has a mihrab, and by it are green rags, said to be the Prophet's clothes. In the court are two Arab graves. To the west are several kokim tombs (stone carved sepulchres) full of bones and skulls. Other caves, cisterns, and a wine-press, north of the Mukam, were observed." Sheikh Samit, or Samat, was said to have been the brother of Shemshun el Jabar, whose Neby was at  Ishwa.

J. Geikie  described the shrine in the 1880s: "A mukam, or shrine, of a Mussulman  saint stands on the south side of the village; a low square building of stone, with a humble dome and a small court, within an old stone wall, at the side. You enter the yard through a small door in this wall, up two or three steps, but beyond the bare walls, and a solitary palm-tree, twice the height of the wall, there is nothing to see. Sheikh Samat, whoever he was, lies solitary enough and well forgotten in his airy sepulchre, but the whitewash covering his resting-place marks a custom which is universal with Mussulman tombs of this kind."

British Mandate
In the 1922 census of Palestine conducted by the British Mandate authorities, Sara'a  had a population 205,  all  Muslims, increasing  in the 1931 census  to 271, still all Muslims, in 65 houses.

In the 1945 statistics the population of Saris was 340, all Muslims, who owned 4,967 dunams of land according to an official land and population survey. Of the land, 194 dunams were plantations and irrigable land and 2,979 were for cereals, while 16 dunams were built-up (urban) land.

1948 war

Sar'a was captured by Israel's Harel Brigade on July 13–14, 1948, during the offensive Operation Dani in the 1948 Arab-Israeli War. Many of the inhabitants had already fled, as the village had been on the front lines since April. Those who had remained fled when the mortar barrages from the approaching Harel columns began; the few that stayed throughout the assault were later expelled. The village's inhabitants fled the village towards various West Bank refugee camps, including Qalandiya.

Israel
Following the war, the area was incorporated into the State of Israel. The moshav of Tarum was established on the north-eastern part of Sar'a's land in 1950, while Tzora was established  about 2 km southwest of the site, on land belonging to Dayr Aban.

According to the Palestinian historian Walid Khalidi, the remaining structures on village land in 1992 were: 
Stone rubble and iron girders are strewn among the trees on the site. A flat stone, surrounded by debris and inscribed with Arabic verses from the Qur'an, bears the date A.H. 1355 (1936). On the western edge of the site stands a shrine containing the tombs of two local religious teachers. A valley to the northeast is covered with fig, almond, and cypress trees.

In the 1990s the "Har Tuv Industrial park" was built, on the land that was used by the village for cereals framing, in the valley on the south east of the built-up area of the village. The Industrial park has since expanded, with a large IKEA superstore opening in 2020, and an Amazon Web Services data center due to open in 2023. During the development work in the area, several Archaeological excavations took place, and finds were uncovered, from prehistoric and protohistoric periods to the Ottoman period, confirming that human settlement in the Sar'a Tell began in the pre-Ceramic Neolithic II period, and dates to about 9000 BC and continued, more or less continuously, from then until the demolition of the village in 1949.

Landmarks
Sar'a had two shrines, one of which is still standing. The first one, destroyed in the 1950s, belonged to al-Nabi Samat, and the other for an unknown individual.

The village has several khirbas (ruined former settlements) including Khirbat al-Tahuna, where the ruins of a building constructed of ashlars (squared stone masonry) and the foundations of other buildings.

See also
Depopulated Palestinian locations in Israel

References

Bibliography

 (p.  334)
 
  
  (p. 904)
  
   

 

 

 
 
  

    
Quarterly statement - Palestine Exploration Fund  Volume: 7-8  (1875): ( p. 211 )
  (pp. 339, 343, 365 )
  (p. 18 )

 
 
  (p. 444)

External links
 Welcome to Sar'a
Sar'a, Zochrot
Lost shrines, Maqam Neby or Sheikh Samat
Survey of Western Palestine, Map 17:  IAA, Wikimedia commons 
Sar'a from the Khalil Sakakini Cultural Center

Arab villages depopulated during the 1948 Arab–Israeli War
District of Jerusalem